Aspronema is a genus of skinks.

Species
The following 2 species, listed alphabetically by specific name, are recognized as being valid:

Aspronema cochabambae (Dunn, 1935) 
Aspronema dorsivittatum (Cope, 1862) – Paraguay mabuya

Nota bene: A binomial authority in parentheses indicates that the species was originally described in a genus other than Aspronema. Both species are found in South America. Both species were previously placed in the genus Mabuya.

References

 
Lizard genera
Taxa named by Stephen Blair Hedges
Taxa named by Caitlin E. Conn